The  is an electric multiple unit (EMU) type operated by the private railway operator Nagoya Railroad (Meitetsu) in Japan since 1991.

Variants
The type consists of nine two-car 1800 series sets introduced in 1991, and three two-car 1850 series sets introduced in 1992, built using the underframes and electrical equipment from withdrawn 7500 series "Panorama Car" EMUs.

Operations

The 1800 series was introduced in 1991 as two-car commuter-style sets to be coupled to six-car 1000/1200 series sets on limited express services during the busy peak hours. Sets are also used on their own or in pairs on other services.

Formations
, the fleet consists of nine two-car 1800 series sets (1801 to 1809) and two two-car 1850 series sets (1851 to 1852), formed as follows.

1800 series

The Mc cars have one lozenge-type pantograph.

1850 series

The Mc2 cars have one lozenge-type pantograph.

Interior
The 1800 and 1850 series cars have transverse seating with flip-over seat backs to face the direction of travel.

History
The 1800 series trains were first introduced in 1991, to augment the 1000/1200 series trainsets. In 1992, three more two-car sets were built, reusing the underframes and electrical equipment from withdrawn 7500 series "Panorama Car" EMU cars.

Refurbishment

From 2017, the fleet underwent a programme of refurbishment. The first 1800 series set to be refurbished and reliveried was 1808 in May 2017.

References

External links

 Meitetsu 1800 series information 

Electric multiple units of Japan
1800 series
Train-related introductions in 1991

ja:名鉄1000系電車#1800系・1850系
1500 V DC multiple units of Japan